Elsnig is a municipality in the district Nordsachsen, in Saxony, Germany, located about 140 km southwest of Berlin.

References 

Nordsachsen